"The Long Goodbye" is a 1954 American television play based on the novel of the same name by Raymond Chandler. It was the first episode of the anthology series Climax! and starred Dick Powell as Philip Marlowe. Powell had played the role previously in Murder, My Sweet.

The episode was broadcast live. Although there was a rumor that actor Tristram Coffin, playing a corpse under a blanket, had got up and walked off the set in view of the live camera, he himself debunked this in an interview; while the blanket over his body was partially removed before he was out of frame, he did not walk off set in full view of the camera.

Cast
Dick Powell as Philip Marlowe
Tom Drake as Terry Lennox
Horace McMahon as Detective
Cesar Romero as Mendy Mendez
Teresa Wright as Eilene Wade 
Tris Coffin as dead body

Reception
The New York Times called it "fine entertainment... a piece that held suspense".

References

External links
The Long Goodbye at IMDb
The Long Goodbye at BFI

1954 television plays
American television episodes